Oleksandr Stanislavovych Syrskyi (born 26 July 1965) is a Ukrainian military officer. Holding the rank of Colonel general, he has been the commander of the Ukrainian Ground Forces since 2019. Previously, he was the commander of the Joint Forces Operation from May to August 2019.

During the Russian invasion of Ukraine, Syrskyi commanded the defence of Kyiv. From September 2022, he commands the Kharkiv counteroffensive.

Biography 
Syrskyi graduated from the Moscow Higher Military Command School, the Soviet Union’s leading higher military educational institution. Before the war in Donbass in the 2000s, he commanded the 72nd Mechanized Brigade and was promoted to major-general.

As of 2013, he was the First Deputy Chief of the Main Command Center of the Armed Forces of Ukraine, and was involved in the then processes of cooperation with NATO. In November 2013, Syrskyi, on behalf of the Ministry of Defense, discussed changes to the Ukrainian army in accordance with NATO standards at NATO headquarters.

War in Donbas 
With the beginning of the war in Eastern Ukraine, he was the chief of staff of anti-terrorist operations.

In particular, he was one of the chief commanders of the anti-terrorist operation forces during the battle of Debaltseve in the winter of 2015, together with the Chief of the General Staff of the Armed Forces of Ukraine Viktor Muzhenko they went to the city itself. He led the battles in Vuhlehirsk, the village of Ridkodub and an unsuccessful attempt to recapture Lohvynove. He also coordinated the withdrawal of the Ukrainian military from Debaltseve. Under his leadership, possible routes of crossing the Karapulka River were blown up.

Oleksandr Syrskyi was awarded the Order of Bohdan Khmelnytsky III degree and later received the rank of lieutenant-general due to his achievement during the battle of Debaltseve.

In 2016, he headed the Joint Operational Headquarters of the Armed Forces of Ukraine, which coordinates the operational actions of various Ukrainian security forces in the Donbas. In 2017, he was the commander of the entire Anti-Terrorist Operation in eastern Ukraine, which was later replaced by Joint Forces Operation.

From 6 May to 5 August 2019 he was the commander of the Joint Operational Staff of the Armed Forces of Ukraine.

Since 5 August 2019, Syrskyi has been the Commander of the Ground Forces of the Armed Forces of Ukraine. On 23 August 2020, he was promoted to the rank of colonel general. The rank is no longer awarded in the Ukrainian army since 1 October of the same year, but Syrskyi retained it, being at this moment the only Ukrainian military officer left in active service to hold this particular rank.

2022 Russian invasion of Ukraine 

During the Russian Invasion of Ukraine, Syrskyi initially organised and lead the defense of Kyiv.

In April 2022, Syrskyi was given the Hero of Ukraine award for his efforts. In September 2022, media reported that Syrskyi is the architect behind the successful Kharkiv counteroffensive. Syrskyi has been described as "the most successful general of the 21st century so far".

Awards 
 Order of Bohdan Khmelnytsky III degree (14 March 2015)
 Order of Bohdan Khmelnytsky II degree (18 March 2022)
 Cross of Combat Merit (17 July 2022)
 Hero of Ukraine (6 April 2022)

References

External links
 (10 September 2022)

Colonel Generals of Ukraine
1965 births
Living people
People from Vladimir Oblast
Recipients of the Order of Gold Star (Ukraine)
Recipients of the Order of Bohdan Khmelnytsky, 3rd class
Ukrainian military personnel of the 2022 Russian invasion of Ukraine
Ukrainian people of Russian descent